Noah Kin (born 1994 in Oslo, Norway) is a Finnish-Nigerian rapper, DJ and producer from Helsinki, Finland. His debut album "No Matter the Season" was released by Helsinki Freedom Records 30. November 2011. From his first album two songs, ”My Name Is Noah Kin” and ”Underground” was released as a bundle music video in September 2011. Noah Kin’s second album 9fngrs was released 27. June 2012. And from this album the song ”the:passion” was released as a music video. His third and latest album ”Now You See” was released 21. March 2014. 
Noah Kin has studied in Helsinki’s Media Upper Secondary School.

Noah Kin signed with the independent record label Cocoa Music for his third solo album in 2014. The young rapper has opened for Wiz Khalifa, Kendrick Lamar and Earl Sweatshirt and performed alongside the legendary Oakland rap group The Coup in Finland.

Despite his young age he has already performed in the United Kingdom, Germany, Norway, Austria, Switzerland, Estonia and in Eurosonic 2014 - where he got picked as one of the top 5 performers of Eurosonic by Switzerland’s radio SRF Virus.

At the age of eleven, Noah Kin decided to become straight edge after seeing how alcohol and drugs affected the lives of people close to him.

Discography 
Albums

 No Matter the Season (2011)
 9fngrs (2012)
 Now You See (2014)

Music videos

 Intro / Underground (2011)
 the:passion (2012)
 822 (2013)
 You Never Asked (2013)
 Sacred Order of the Pen

Drama film
 Saattokeikka (2017)

Guest appearances

References

1994 births
Finnish rappers
Living people
Finnish people of Nigerian descent
Norwegian people of Finnish descent